Bharya Onnu Makkal Moonnu (English: Wife: One, Children: Three) is a 2009 Malayalam film directed by Rajasenan and starring Rajasenan and Sithara. This is Rajasenan's debut film as an actor.

Plot 
Chandramohan Thampi has never been able to live up to the expectations of his father Sachidanandan Thampi. On the other hand, his younger brother Rajmohan Thampi has made it big in business. Problems mount up when he marries a Christian girl from a poor family, Lisamma. He becomes a post master and walks out of his home.

Lisamma has a heart ailment and Chandramohan borrows a money to treat her. Sometime later, the couple has three children. Meanwhile, Chandramohan's debts pile up. His schoolmate GK takes him to the Gulf to help him recover his debts.

Cast 
 Rajasenan as Chandramohan Thampi
 Mukesh as GK
 Sithara as Lisamma
 Shivaji Guruvayoor as Sachidanandan Thampi
 Jagathy Sreekumar
 Rahman as Rajmohan Thampi
 Sindhu Menon
 Indrans as Moidheen
 Kalpana
 Jannet
 Drisya
 Saju Kodiyan
 Master Deepak

References

See also
 Malayalam films of 2009

2009 films
2000s Malayalam-language films
2009 drama films
Indian drama films
Films directed by Rajasenan
Films scored by M. Jayachandran